Rats Saw God is a young adult novel written by Rob Thomas, published in 1996.

Plot
It follows the main character Steve York, the son of an astronaut. Steve is a high school student who has had issues with marijuana and has found himself in the counselor's office. The counselor tells him that he is flunking and if he wants to graduate he must write a 100-page paper about anything. Steve is reluctant to do so, at first, but eventually relents and begins the tale about the divorce of his parents, his prickly relationship with his father, and his first real relationship with a girl nicknamed Dub. Told in parallel timelines and bouncing back and forth from his senior year to his sophomore year, through writing the book Steve eventually comes to see his father as he'd never seen him before and understands that many of the things that he thought were true were completely wrong.

Structure
The story takes place over the four years Steve is in high school. The narrative is interlaced between his senior year in San Diego, California and flashbacks to his freshman to junior years in Houston, Texas. The time described in Houston is supposedly the 100-page essay written by Steve as his extra English class necessary for graduation. To set off the different parts of the story Steve's time in Houston is presented in Gill Sans sans-serif typeface while his time in San Diego is shown in Industria.

Characters
 Steve York - the main character, a high school student who is brilliant, but alienated from his peers by his parents' divorce and his disastrous relationship with his father. After the divorce, Steve starts drugs and flunks school, but is given one chance to graduate by writing a one hundred page essay.
 Alan York - Steve's father, referred to by his son as "the astronaut"
 Sarah York - Steve's younger sister
 Dub - Wanda Varner, Steve's girlfriend during his sophomore year of high school
 Doug - Steve's best friend in high school
 Jeff DeMouy - Steve's senior year guidance counselor
 Sky - Steve's English teacher in Houston
 Allison Kimble - Steve's girlfriend during his senior year of high school

Title
The novel's title originates from a student group in the novel, the Grace Order of Dadaists also known by its abbreviated name GOD.  This group used American Sign Language in their yearbook photo to spell out the phrase "Dog Was Star" which is the reverse of the phrase "Rats Saw God".  Author Thomas later created the television series Veronica Mars and called a season 2 episode "Rat Saw God" after the book. Steve's sophomore-year girlfriend Wanda Varner was later used as the name of a character on the series in the episode "Return of the Kane".

In addition, a character named Alan York is referenced in the episode "Astroburger" of the TV series iZombie, also created by Thomas. In this incarnation, York is also an astronaut.

Awards
The book was awarded the ALA Best Books for Young Adults in 1997.

References

1996 American novels
American young adult novels
Novels set in San Diego
Novels set in Houston
1996 debut novels